Jason Hoppner is a former member of the Australian Men's Handball Team (1995-2011) and former  coach of the Australian Women's Handball Team (2013 - 2015). 

Prior to coaching the National Women's Team Jason Hoppner coached the National U20 Men's Team for 4 years leading the team to victory at both the 2010 (Australia) and 2012 (Samoa) IHF Oceania Challenge Trophy.   In 2013 The team competed at the IHF Challenge Trophy in Mexico.

In 2013 Jason Hoppner was appointed Women's National Team Coach and participated at the Handball World Championships in Serbia.   

As a player, Jason Hoppner competed at the 2005 and 2011 Handball World Championships.   Between the years 1998 and 2002 he played in Hungary for the handball teams Csomor (NB1B), Szazhallombatta (NB1) & BP Honved (NB2).

References

Living people
Australian handball coaches
Year of birth missing (living people)